Rudolf Eklöw (15 January 1904 - 29 September 1986, in Stockholm) was a sports journalist, association football referee, and Swedish sports manager. He is known for writing under his pseudonym: "The R" (Swedish: "R:et").

Awards and achievements 
 Inductee to IIHF Hall of Fame 1999
 IIHF Honorary Member 1976
 Inductee to Swedish Hockey Hall of Fame 2012

Career 
International referee from 1935 to 1939, he served in major competitions 
 Baltic Cup football 1935 (3 games)
 Football at the 1936 Summer Olympics (1 match)
 Baltic Cup football 1936 (3 games)
 Nordic Football Championship 1937-1947 (2 matches)

References 

1904 births
1986 deaths
IIHF Hall of Fame inductees
Sportspeople from Stockholm
Swedish football referees
Journalists from Stockholm
Swedish referees and umpires
Swedish sports journalists